Haredevil Hare is a 1948 Looney Tunes cartoon directed by Chuck Jones. It stars Bugs Bunny and it is the debut for Marvin the Martian — although he is unnamed in this film—along with his Martian dog, K-9. Marvin's nasal voice for this first film is different from the later one he is most known for. This is also the last pre-August 1948 Looney Tunes and Merrie Melodies cartoon whose copyright was sold to Associated Artists Productions.

Plot
The cartoon opens with the newspaper ('The Daily Snooze) headlines "Scientists to Launch First Rocket to Moon" and "Heroic Rabbit Volunteers as First Passenger" (also with two titles that look as though they were pulled from real papers, namely, "Big eastern interests" and "60,000 Greeks in big push on guerrillas"). However, the scene then changes to Bugs literally being dragged across the launching pad to the waiting rocket as he frantically protests against what is to be expected of him, but then immediately becomes cooperative when he sees the rocket being loaded with carrots. The rocket is then launched into space. Shocked by the sudden acceleration of the rocket, Bugs attempts to exit it, but when he opens up the hatch, he is horrified when he sees that the rocket has now already left Earth.

When the rocket lands on the Moon, Bugs has a panic attack, but quickly regains his composure as he starts to walk on the surface of the moon, contemplating the fact that he is the first living creature to set foot on it, while passing behind a large rock on which the words "Kilroy was here" are written. Another rocket soon lands nearby, called the Mars to Moon Expeditionary Force from the planet Mars, and from it emerges an unnamed Martian (later known as Marvin the Martian), who begins work on something that involves a missile and clearly concerns Earth.

Curious, Bugs asks Marvin what he is up to, and Marvin explains he is there to blow up the earth. Bugs is initially not concerned, until he realizes the severity of the situation and steals from Marvin the missile's fuel source, a Uranium PU-36 Explosive Space Modulator, a small device resembling, and that operates the same as, a mere stick of dynamite. He shortly has to then deal with Marvin's Martian dog, named K-9, who, as ordered to by Marvin, retrieves it while Bugs is distracted trying to send an SOS to Earth. In one of his classic word switcheroos, and after that through flattery, which the dog is absent-mindlessly, extremely prone to, Bugs successfully gets the Uranium PU-36 Explosive Space Modulator back.

This prompts an angry Marvin to berate and scold his dog. Bugs quickly arrives disguised as a Martian with a "special delivery from Mars" and hands Marvin the Uranium PU-36 Explosive Space Modulator, now wired to a detonator. While Marvin is celebrating the return of the Uranium PU-36, Bugs activates the detonator. The explosion reduces the moon to a crescent. A silhouette on earth resembling Friz Freleng contacts Bugs Bunny, and asks if he has a statement to the press. Bugs, hanging precariously from the edge of the Moon, with Marvin and the dog clinging to him and dangling below, answers that he does, and in his typical Brooklyn accent yells out, "GET ME OUTTA HERE!"

Reception
Animation producer Paul Dini writes, "Before director Chuck Jones cast Bugs Bunny in the more or less permanent role of unflappable hero, the director and his animators seemed to delight in emotionally challenging their long-eared star. Nowhere is that more gleefully apparent than in 1948's Haredevil Hare, wherein the reluctant space-going rabbit is called upon to display terror, greed, nonchalance, innocence, and frustration, with side trips to wise-guy confidence and doe-eyed flirtation. Ben Washam's brilliant animation of Bugs' extended post-crash jitters is reason enough to place this cartoon among the Warner Bros. greats."

Home media
This cartoon is included on disc 3 of the Looney Tunes Golden Collection: Volume 1 DVD set and also included on disc 2 of the Looney Tunes Platinum Collection: Volume 1 Blu-ray box set with the cartoon restored and in high definition. This short is also available on disc 1 of The Essential Bugs Bunny.

See also
 Looney Tunes and Merrie Melodies filmography (1940–1949)
 List of Bugs Bunny cartoons
 List of Marvin the Martian cartoons

References

External links

 

1940s English-language films
1948 short films
1948 animated films
Looney Tunes shorts
Warner Bros. Cartoons animated short films
American animated science fiction films
Short films directed by Chuck Jones
1940s science fiction films
Animated films about dogs
Animated films about extraterrestrial life
Moon in film
Mars in film
Films scored by Carl Stalling
Bugs Bunny films
Marvin the Martian films
1940s Warner Bros. animated short films
Films with screenplays by Michael Maltese
American animated short films
Animated films about rabbits and hares